Teresa do Rosário Afonso Portela (born 30 October 1987) is a Portuguese sprint canoer who has competed since the late 2000s. She won a bronze medal in the K-4 200 m event at the 2009 ICF Canoe Sprint World Championships in Dartmouth. At club level, she competes for S.L. Benfica.

Portela also competed in the K-1 500 m event at the 2008 Summer Olympics in Beijing, China, but she was eliminated in the semifinals. In 2010, Portela won the gold in the K1 200m World Cup at Szeged, Hungary. In 2011, she won a bronze medal at the European Championships in Belgrade and also won the World Cup II meet, both in the K1 200 discipline. That year, Portela won her 50th national title, having won a total of 52.

Portela qualified for London 2012 in K4 500, K1 500 and K1 200 at the World Championships in Szeged 2011. After a year off, Portela was back racing in 2014 winning a medal at the World Cup in Szeged and double bronze in the Europeans, finishing with a 5th place in the K1 500 m in the World Championships in Moscow, Russia.

References

External links
 
 
 Teresa Portela official blog at blogspot.com

1987 births
Living people
People from Esposende
Portuguese female canoeists
Olympic canoeists of Portugal
Canoeists at the 2008 Summer Olympics
Canoeists at the 2012 Summer Olympics
Canoeists at the 2016 Summer Olympics
Canoeists at the 2020 Summer Olympics
ICF Canoe Sprint World Championships medalists in kayak
Mediterranean Games bronze medalists for Portugal
S.L. Benfica (canoeing)
Mediterranean Games medalists in canoeing
Competitors at the 2018 Mediterranean Games
European Games competitors for Portugal
Canoeists at the 2015 European Games
Canoeists at the 2019 European Games
Sportspeople from Braga District